Rina is a feminine given name with multiple origins. In Japanese kanji, it could be written as (里奈, 璃奈, 莉愛, 璃菜, 利奈, 理名, 莉菜, 里菜, 梨奈, and 理菜). It is also a feminine name in the Sanskrit language meaning "melted" or "dissolved", and is also a Hebrew name meaning "song; joy". The name Rina is also a hypocoristic for various names ending with 'rina' (Italian Caterina, German Katharina, Russian Ekaterina and others) and is a feminine given name of Japanese origins. Rina is also a similar name of Rena.

Actresses

Rina Aizawa (逢沢 りな, born 1991), Japanese actress and gravure idol
, Japanese actress, gravure idol and television personality
, Japanese actress
Rina Koike (小池 里奈, born 1993), Japanese actress and idol
Rina Kitagawa (born 1993), Japanese voice actress
Rina Nakayama (born 1984), Japanese voice actress
Rina Misaki, female Japanese voice actress and singer
Rina Morelli (1908-1976), an Italian film and stage actress
Rina Satō (佐藤 利奈, born 1981), Japanese actress and singer
Rina Uchiyama (内山 理名, born 1981), Japanese actress and idol
Rina Zelyonaya (1902-1991), Soviet actress and singer

Athletes

, Japanese Paralympic swimmer
Rina Hill (born 1969), Australian/British athlete
, Japanese curler
Rina Dewi Puspitasari (born 1985), Indonesian archer
Rina Thieleke (born 1987), German ice dancer

Musicians and singers

Rina Aiuchi (愛内 里菜, born 1980), former J-pop singer, songwriter, and producer
Rina Balaj (born 1999), Kosovo-Albanian rapper
Rina Chikano (近野 莉菜, born 1993), member of the J-pop idol group AKB48
Rina Chinen (知念 里奈, born 1981), Japanese entertainer, model, TV actress, and former singer
Rina Fujisawa (藤沢　里菜 born 1998), Japanese professional Go player
Rina Ketty (1911-1996), French chanteuse
Rina Massardi (1897–1979), Italian-Uruguayan singer, actress, and filmmaker
Rina Sawayama (born 1990), Japanese-British singer-songwriter
Rina Suzuki (musician) (鈴木理菜, born 1991), Japanese musician, drummer, and vocalist of the all-female pop rock band SCANDAL

Other persons
Rina Banerjee (born 1963), Indian-American artist
Rina Foygel Barber, American statistician
Rina Chibany (born 1991), Miss Lebanon and Miss Universe 2012 contestant
Rina Fukushi (born 1999), Japanese model
Rina Lasnier (1915-1997), Canadian Québécoise poet
Rina Mimoun, American television writer and producer
Rina Mor (born 1956), first Israeli Miss Universe winner
Rina Piccolo, Canadian cartoonist
Rina Schenfeld (born 1938), Israeli choreographer and dancer
Rina Venter (born 1938), first woman in South African history to hold a cabinet post (Minister of National Health and Population Development)
Rina Zazkis, Canadian educator and academic

Fictional characters
Rina (Guitar Hero), a character in the video game Guitar Hero World Tour
Rina, a female bassist in the TV series Drake & Josh 
Rina, a patient from season 3 of the TV series Grey's Anatomy 
Rina Lazarus, one of the two main characters in the Decker/Lazarus novels
Rina, the female protagonist of A Jewish Girl in Shanghai
Rina (Suikoden), character in the console role-playing game Suikoden II
Rina Tōin (洞院 リナ), a character from the anime and manga series Mermaid Melody Pichi Pichi Pitch
, a character from the media project Nijigasaki High School Idol Club
Rina Umebayashi (梅林里奈), the main character from the Legend of the Angel webcomic series

References

Japanese feminine given names
Hebrew feminine given names
Indonesian feminine given names